is a Japanese virtual YouTuber (VTuber) affiliated with Hololive Production. She is part of Hololive (Japan) 1st Generation alongside Akai Haato, Yozora Mel, Shirakami Fubuki and Aki Rosenthal. Matsuri debuted as a VTuber on June 1, 2018, and has since amassed over 1 million subscribers on YouTube.

Overview 
From May 2 to 13, 2018, Cover, the management company of Hololive, held a VTuber audition to look for individuals who have experience in live streaming and video uploading and want to challenge themselves as VTubers. The character designs and name of the five open spots that would later debut as Generation 1 were made public at the start of the audition. The design of Natsuiro Matsuri was llustrated by artist Haruki Minamura, and a 3D model by Pompu-chou was created later on.

Natsuiro Matsuri made her Twitter debut on May 31 and streamed her YouTube debut on June 1.

Activity 
Matsuri started her livestreaming activities in June 2018. Her livestreams mainly consist of her chatting and playing games. She also sings, sometimes showing this off in her streams.

On 27 August 2019, she reached 100,000 YouTube subscribers.

Her first original song  was released on 20 June 2020.

In July 2020, it was announced that a Matsuri Nendoroid figure would be produced.

Appearances outside YouTube

Drama 
 Watanukisan chi no (2020) playing: Wakaki Haru.

TV programs 
※ indicates Internet stream
 bilibili Spring V Festival 赏樱会 (March 22, 2020, bilibili※・Niconico live streaming※)
 NHK Virtual cultural festival (August 14, 2020, NHK General TV)

Television animation
 The Detective Is Already Dead (2021, Natsuiro Matsuri)

Game 
 Dawn of the Breakers (2019, Natsuiro Matsuri)
 Azur Lane (2019, Natsuiro Matsuri)
 Groove Coaster: Wai Wai Party!!!! (2020, Natsuiro Matsuri) – DLC Character
Brave Nine – Tactical RPG (2020, Yurisea)

Other 
 VTuber chips 2 (2020) collaboration

Discography

Singles 
 "HiHi High Tension!" – July 23, 2021

Songs featured in

Singles

Albums

References

External links 
 
 

Hololive Production
Japanese YouTubers
Living people
Year of birth missing (living people)
YouTube channels launched in 2018
YouTube streamers